Costantino Costantini (9 August 1904 – 9 June 1982) was an Italian architect. His work was part of the architecture event in the art competition at the 1936 Summer Olympics.

References

1904 births
1982 deaths
20th-century Italian architects
Olympic competitors in art competitions
People from Imperia